Events in the year 1984 in Norway.

Incumbents
 Monarch – Olav V
 Prime Minister – Kåre Willoch (Conservative Party)

Events

 20 January – Arne Treholt was arrested on suspicion of spying for the Soviet Union.
 17 July – The first baby conceived in Norway by artificial insemination is born at the Regional Hospital of Trondheim.
 1 September – NRK P2 begins its radio broadcasts from Trondheim.

Popular culture

Sports
 The 1984 Norwegian Football Cup was won by Fredrikstad after beating Viking 3–2 in the final.

Music 

 Live at Jazz Alive, live album by Thorgeir Stubø

Film

Literature
 Simen Skjønsberg, journalist and writer, is awarded the Gyldendal's Endowment literature prize.

Notable births

 3 January – Rannveig Aamodt, rock climber
 4 January – Trond Bersu, musician
 16 January – Line Jahr, ski jumper
 5 February – Trond Olsen, footballer
 20 February – Mari Kvien Brunvoll, folk and jazz singer
 26 February – Espen Ruud, footballer
 26 April – Andrea Rydin Berge, jazz musician
 6 May – Gard Kvale, swimmer.
 25 May – Marion Raven, singer-songwriter
 28 May – Ina Wroldsen, singer-songwriter
 29 May – Jo Berger Myhre, musician
 13 June – Anna Ljunggren, politician
 18 June – Frida Ånnevik, jazz singer
 8 July – Jo Skaansar, jazz musician
 15 July – Linn Jørum Sulland, handball player.
 19 July – Lasse Gjertsen, animator, musician, and videographer
 27 July – Cecilie Myrseth, politician 
 14 August – Kristoffer Kompen, jazz musician
 14 August – Marius Arion Nilsen, politician.
 12 November – Einar Riegelhuth Koren, handball player
 17 November – Erik Solbakken, television presenter
 26 September – Martin Johnsrud Sundby, cross-country skier.
 27 November – Jon Kristian Fjellestad, organist and composer
 28 November – Richard Colman, Australian Paralympic athlete (born in Stavanger, Norway)
 27 December – Jørgen Mathisen, jazz musician

Notable deaths

 10 January – Thoralf Strømstad, Nordic skier and Olympic silver medallist (born 1897)
 20 January – Hagbart Haakonsen, cross country skier (born 1895)
 24 January – Egil Halmøy, politician (born 1901)
 1 February – Hans Vinjarengen, skier, Olympic silver medallist and World Champion (born 1905)
 13 February – Fartein Valen-Sendstad, historian and museologist (born 1918).
 4 March – Odd Bang-Hansen, novelist and children's writer (born 1908)
 9 March – Kristian Johansson, ski jumper (born 1907)
 25 March – Martin Stokken, cross country skier and Olympic silver medallist, athlete (born 1923)
 5 April – Lillemor von Hanno, actress and writer (born 1900).
 14 April – Anders Haugen, ski jumper (born 1888)
 22 April – Erling Nilsen, boxer and Olympic bronze medallist (born 1910).
 23 April – Ivar Johansen, bobsledder (born 1910).
 26 April – Helge Løvland, decathlete and Olympic gold medallist (born 1890)
 21 May – Randi Bakke, pair skater (born 1904)
 6 July – Johan Lauritz Eidem, politician (born 1891)
 29 July – Erling Johan Vindenes, politician (born 1900)
 24 August – John Johnsen, swimmer (born 1892)
 4 September – Ragna Johanne Forsberg, politician (born 1908)
 4 September – Bjarne Johnsen, gymnast and Olympic gold medallist (born 1892)
 6 September – Leiv Kreyberg, pathologist (born 1896).
 9 September – Gunnar Jamvold, sailor and Olympic gold medallist (born 1896)
 20 September – Frithjof Bettum, jurist and politician (born 1900)
 22 October – Sverre Østbye, Nordic skier (born 1889)
 23 October – Hans Karolus Ommedal, politician (born 1901)
 4 November – Lars Amandus Aasgard, politician (born 1907)
 20 November – Trygve Bratteli, politician and twice Prime Minister of Norway (born 1910).

Full date missing
 Henrik Edland, veterinarian (born 1905)
 Rolf Gammleng, violinist and organizational leader (born 1898).
 Magnhild Haalke, novelist (born 1885)
 Mikkel Ødelien, soil researcher (born 1893)
 Petter Pettersson, Jr., politician (born 1911)
 August Schou, historian (born 1903)
 Reidar Fauske Sognnaes, Dean of Harvard School of Dental Medicine, forensic scientist (born 1911)

See also

References

External links